Toni Siebenhaar (27 August 1923 – 28 January 2000) was a German rower. He competed in the men's eight event at the 1952 Summer Olympics.

References

External links
 

1923 births
2000 deaths
German male rowers
Olympic rowers of Germany
Rowers at the 1952 Summer Olympics
People from Schweinfurt
Sportspeople from Lower Franconia